Polybrominated biphenyls (PBBs), also called brominated biphenyls or polybromobiphenyls, are a group of manufactured chemicals that consist of polyhalogenated derivatives of a biphenyl core. Their chlorine analogs are the PCBs. While once widely used commercially, PBBs are now controlled substances under the Restriction of Hazardous Substances Directive, which limits their use in electrical and electronic products sold in the EU.

Characteristics

PBBs usually exist as colorless to off-white solids. PBBs soften at 72 degrees Celsius and decompose above 300 degrees Celsius. They have low vapor pressure, are very soluble in benzene and toluene, and insoluble in water. They are degraded by UV light.

Application

PBBs are used as flame retardants of the brominated flame retardant group. They are added to plastics used in products such as home electrical appliances, textiles, plastic foams, laptop cabinets, etc. to make them difficult to burn.

A number of substituted PBBs found application in medicine, namely bromophene and bromofenofos.

Health hazards

Exposure to the coplanar stereoisomer 3,3',4,4',5,5'-hexabromobiphenyl (but not the non-coplanar stereoisomer) in genetically susceptible mice is known to cause immunotoxicity and disorders related to the central nervous system, and even at doses as low as 2.5 mg/kg, excess neonatal fatalities are observed (LD50 is from 5–10 mg/kg). The mechanism of toxicity is cellular oxidative stress by aryl hydrocarbon receptor activation.

There is evidence that pre- and post-natal exposure to PBB in girls leads to menarche at an earlier age.

Early studies on the effects of PBBs on human beings concerned the people in Michigan, United States who consumed PBB-contaminated animal products (see history of PBBs below). A study of 327 girls aged 5–24 years in Michigan found those who were exposed in utero to PBBs at or above a level of 7 ppb found had an earlier age at menarche compared to a case-control group. Michigan dairy farmers exposed to PBBs had significant immune system abnormalities including reduced numbers of circulating blood lymphocytes, increases in lymphocytes with no detectable surface markers, and reduced functional response to specific test antigens. Some residents complained of nausea, abdominal pain, loss of appetite, joint pain and lethargy, though it could not be clearly established that PBBs were the cause of these health problems.
Workers who were exposed to PBB during PBB production suffered hypothyroidism, although no deterioration in memory performance was found in PBB-exposed workers in tests conducted several years after final PBB exposure, and there was also no correlation of performance with PBB concentration.

There is stronger evidence that PBBs may have caused skin problems, such as acne, in consumers of the contaminated food. Some workers exposed to PBBs by breathing and skin contact for days to months also developed acne.

Studies in animals exposed to large amounts of PBBs for a short period or to smaller amounts over a longer period show that PBBs can cause weight loss, skin disorders, nervous and immune systems effects, as well as effects on the liver, kidneys, and thyroid gland.

Possibility of carcinogenicity
It is not known for certain if PBBs could cause cancer in human beings, but it has been observed that they can lead to cancer in lab mice exposed to very high concentrations of PBBs. Based on such animal tests, the United States Department of Health and Human Services has determined that PBBs may reasonably be anticipated to be carcinogens. The International Agency for Research on Cancer also suggests that PBBs are possibly carcinogenic to humans.

Michigan PBB contamination incident

Before the 1970s, PBBs were widely used commercially as a flame retardant. Michigan Chemical Corporation (MCC) in St. Louis, Michigan, which was then owned by Velsicol Chemical Corporation, was a major producer of the FireMaster range of PBB-based flame retardants. FireMaster BP-6 (a yellow-brown powder) is a mixture of many different PBB congeners with 2,2',4,4',5,5'-hexabromobiphenyl and 2,2',3,4,4',5,5'-heptabromobiphenyl being significant constituents by mass (60-80% and 12-25%, respectively). FireMaster FF-1 (a white powder) is FireMaster BP-6 with the addition of 2% calcium silicate as an anti-caking agent. Mixed bromochlorobiphenyls and polybrominated naphthalenes, as well as lower brominated compounds formed by incomplete bromination, have also been found as minor constituents of FireMaster products.

In summer 1973, several thousand pounds of FireMaster BP-6 were accidentally mixed with livestock feed that was distributed to farms in Michigan, United States because the MCC plant also produced a feed precursor ingredient, magnesium oxide, which was sold to the feed manufacturer. Some 1.5 million chickens, 30,000 cattle, 5,900 pigs, and 1,470 sheep then consumed this feed, became contaminated with PBBs and the carcasses were disposed of in landfill sites throughout the state. In 1976, the Michigan Department of Community Health established a PBB registry to gather and analyze data on exposed residents. It now resides at the Rollins School of Public Health at Emory University, and is maintained by epidemiologist Michele Marcus. 

Michigan Farmer magazine staff members Richard Lehnert and Bonnie Pollard broke the news of the contamination. The magazine continued coverage of the issue until the eventual bankruptcy proceedings of the farm cooperative responsible for the accidental contamination and subsequent distribution of the feed. These events were also portrayed in the 1981 documentary Cattlegate by Jeff Jackson, the true-fiction film Bitter Harvest starring Ron Howard, and in the book The Poisoning of Michigan by Joyce Egginton. A 1978 episode of Lou Grant ("Slaughter") portrays a similar, but fictionalized account. One year elapsed before the animals were culled. 

This incident is cited amongst a handful of other noxious substances as the driver for Gerald Ford's half-hearted approval in 1976 of the Toxic Substances Control Act, which "remains one of the most controversial regulatory bills ever passed".

Landrigan study
A study was undertaken on 4,545 people to determine the effects of PBBs on human beings. These include three exposure groups – all people who lived on the quarantined farms, people who received food from these farms and workers (and their families) engaged in PBB manufacture – as well as 725 people with low-level PBB exposure.

All were queried concerning 17 symptoms and conditions possibly related to PBBs. Venous blood was drawn and analyzed for PBB by gas chromatography. Mean serum PBB levels were found to be 26.9 ppb by weight (26.9 µg/kg) in farm residents, 17.1 in recipients, 43.0 ppb in workers, and 3.4 ppb in the low exposure group. No associations could be established between serum PBB levels and symptom prevalence rates.

To evaluate peripheral lymphocyte function, T and B cell quantitation and in vitro responses to three nonspecific mitogens were studied in 34 persons with highest PBB levels (mean: 787 ppb), and in 56 with low levels (mean: 2.8 ppb). No statistically significant differences in lymphocyte function were noted.

However, as of 2015 these studies are still ongoing, and 40 years later adverse reproductive-system effects (as measured by the Apgar score of the newborns) continue to be found in the grandchildren of those who consumed tainted farm products.

Bans and restrictions

Noting the possible hazards on the environment, however, PBBs were listed as one of six controlled substances under the Restriction of Hazardous Substances Directive (RoHS), which was enacted into European Law in February 2003. RoHS legislation lists PBBs as a "restricted substance" group. Other countries followed suit, resulting most recently in restriction dates instituted in China on March 1, 2007 and South Korea on July 1, 2007.

References

External links
 Aftermath of Michigan Contamination 

Endocrine disruptors
Flame retardants
Bromoarenes
Persistent organic pollutants under the Stockholm Convention
Persistent organic pollutants under the Convention on Long-Range Transboundary Air Pollution
Biphenyls
1973 disasters in the United States
1973 in the environment
Presidency of Gerald Ford